The  is a river in Yachiyo and Chiba, Chiba Prefecture, Japan. Pollution is problematic along the river. Phosphorus, potassium, and nitrogen drain from vegetable farms along the length of the river.

Recreation 

A large-scale bicycle path, the Inbanuma Bicycle Path, is under construction to span the entirety of the Inba Discharge Channel. The path will ultimately pass through Chiba City, Yachiyo, Sakura, and Inba. A  walking path has also been built in Yachiyo along the Shin River, and features a pedestrian suspension bridge with an observation platform.

References 

Rivers of Chiba Prefecture
Rivers of Japan

ja:印旛放水路